Arunachalam is a 1997 Indian Tamil-language action drama film directed by Sundar C. and written by Crazy Mohan. The film stars Rajinikanth, Soundarya and Rambha, with Jaishankar, Ravichandran and Visu in supporting roles. The soundtrack and background score for the film was composed by Deva, while U. K. Senthil Kumar handled the cinematography. The film is loosely based on the 1902 novel Brewster's Millions by George Barr McCutcheon.

The film opened in April 1997 to highly positive reviews from film critics and went on to win three Tamil Nadu State Film Awards, including an award for Best Film.

Plot
A village head Arunachalam who has two brothers Saravanan, Shakthi, and a sister Arundhati and a happy family. Ammayappa and Janaki are his parents. Vedavalli is the daughter of Aathikesavan and Umayal. Nirmala is Ammayappa's sister and they all come to Ammayappa's home for Arunachalam's sister's wedding. That gives the opportunity for Vedavalli and Arunachalam to fight first, then fall in love with each other.

Arunachalam finds himself to be an orphan by interval. He goes out of the village. He goes to Madras where he meets Beeda Kathavarayan, who gives him a job. By some magical situation Arunachalam discovers himself to be the son of India's richest (dead) billionaire Vedhachalam through Rangachari. Rangachari is the guardian of Arunachalam's father's trust. If Arunachalam wants his inheritance, he has to follow certain rules. He can get an inheritance of 3000 Crore Rupees if he can spend 30 crores in 30 days. The conditions are: no contributions to charities, not to own any assets at the end of 30 days and above all, no one else should know about this and receipts should be provide for all the expenses. If Arunachalam fails to spend the money according to the rules, all the money will go to his father's trust which is managed by Vishwanath, Prathap, Kurian and Kaliyaperumal. These four form a team of "villains". They want to spoil Arunachalam's efforts and get all the money for the trust and kill Rangachari. Nandhini is Rangachari's daughter and she is appointed as the accountant for Arunachalam for 30 days.

Arunachalam tries hard to spend his money and many times, the money comes back. He spends on Horse races, lottery tickets, makes a movie with Arivazhagan as the hero and he even starts his own political party with Kathavarayan being the candidate. All these events are good opportunities for situation comedies. Does Arunachalam win this competition, does he get all the 3000 Crore rupees for himself and live happily ever after is the rest of the story. The film ends with Arunachalam and Vedavalli's marriage.

Cast

 Rajinikanth as Arunachalam & Vedhachalam (dual role)
 Soundarya as Vedhavalli Aathikesavan (Voice dubbed by Savitha Reddy)
 Rambha as Nandhini Rangachari
 Jaishankar as Aathikesavan
 Ravichandran as Ammayappa
 Raghuvaran as Vishwanath
 Visu as Rangachari
 V. K. Ramasamy as Kaliyaperumal
 Nizhalgal Ravi as Prathap
 Kitty as Kurian
 Senthil as Arivazhagan
 Janagaraj as Beeda Kathavarayan
 Raja as Saravanan
 Anju Aravind as Arundhati
 Shakthi Kumar as Shakthi
 Manorama as Lakshmi 
 Ponnambalam as Ponnambalam
 Vadivukkarasi as Senior Vedhavalli
 K. R. Vatsala as Janaki
 Vennira Aadai Nirmala as Umayal
 Vinu Chakravarthy as Chokkalingam
 Vichu Vishwanath as Chandrasekhar
 Thalapathy Dinesh as Rajendran
 Crazy Mohan as Ayyasaamy
 Ambika as Meenakshi
 MRK
 T. V. Varadarajan
 Halwa Vasu
 Sundar C. in a cameo appearance as a reporter in the song "Singam Ondru"
 Sridhar as Dancer

Production

Development 

After the success of Muthu in 1995, Rajinikanth took a year out dabbling in politics and taking a sabbatical before announcing that his next film would be Arunachalam written by Crazy Mohan. It was announced that the film would be produced to help eight of his struggling film industry colleagues and it was incorrectly earlier reported that the film would be produced under his newly floated Rajini Arts banner. It was indicated that some of the people who the film would go on to cause benefits for included Kalakendra Govindharajan who introduced Rajinikanth in his production Apoorva Raagangal (1975), Kalaignyanam who featured Rajinikanth in the lead role for the first time with his production Bairavi (1978) and brothers Ramji and Babji who produced some of the actor's early hits, Kaali (1980) and Garjanai (1980). Furthermore, collections would also be shared between the family of Sathya Studio Padmanabhan, actress Pandari Bai, actor V. K. Ramasamy and producer Madurai Nagaraja. Initial reports had also titled the film as Kuberan and Meshtri, but Arunachalam was eventually retained. The plot of the film was inspired by George Barr McCutcheon's 1902 novel Brewster's Millions.

The Director Sundar C. has stated in an interview that he didn't like the story of Arunachalam and he did it because he didn't want to miss an opportunity to work with Rajinikanth. He also mentioned that Rajinikanth is the one who called and narrated him the story and asked him to direct.

Sundar C. also said if he didn't like the story Rajinikanth would simply change the director. Sundar C heard from a producer who's close to Rajini, that "Once Rajini takes a decision he doesn't go back, and he'll only work with people who work according to that vision." So Sundar C. accepted the story even though he didn't like it as he didn't want to miss working with the legend, Rajinikanth. As he knew Rajini would not change the story for working with Sundar, but he would change the director.

Casting 
Initially the lead heroine of the film was expected to be Meena, who had featured in Rajinikanth's previous film, Muthu before Soundarya and Rambha were signed on as heroines. The initial cast list released to the media also had Jayaram in the cast of the film as well as Vignesh, who was later replaced by Raja. Manorama was also surprisingly added to the cast after causing controversy the previous year by lashing out at Rajinikanth's political motives.

Filming 
Rajinikanth lost his sentimental Rudraksh bead during the shooting of the film and was shocked and upset to note that his Rudraksh was missing. He ordered a search at the shooting spot at midnight and with the help of the giant lights used for shooting, he later found the divine bead after a while.

Soundtrack

The music was composed by Deva. The song "Nagumo" had two versions, Hariharan's version was included in soundtrack only, while another version with the vocals of Krishnaraj was included in the film only. Audio was released under the music label "Big B" of Amitabh Bachchan. The tune of Alli Alli Anarkali was lifted from the songs "Ladki Ladki" from Shreemaan Aashique (1993), which was composed by Nadeem–Shravan and "Tutak Tutak Tutiyan" from Ghar Ka Chiraag (1989), which was composed by Bappi Lahiri

Release
The film was released theatrically on 10 April 1997.

Reception

Critical response 
Indolink.com said that "the saving grace of the film is Rajini himself. He has the exceptional ability to convincingly portray the same utopian role of anger and love, innocence and impetuousness...and whats more...he does it with remarkable freshness time and again". The Hindu wrote on 18 April 1997, "Arunachalam contains all the elements that provide escapist entertainment [...] humour, fairplay, love, feud occupy the frames". New Straits Times wrote, "Go with an open mind and you will enjoy this movie".

Box office 
The film was declared a commercial success at the box office, although not as big as Rajinikanth's previous films Baashha and Muthu (both 1995).

Awards
Arunachalam went on to win three Tamil Nadu State Film Awards, including an award for Best Film. Super Subbarayan and Gopi Kanth also respectively won awards for Best Stunt Coordinator and Best Art Director.

Tamil Nadu State Film Awards
 Best Film- Arunachalam
 Best Stunt Coordinator- Super Subbarayan
 Best Art Director- Gopi Kanth

References

External links
 

1997 films
Films scored by Deva (composer)
1990s Tamil-language films
Films about inheritances
Films directed by Sundar C.
Films based on Brewster's Millions
Films based on American novels
Films shot in Karnataka
Films with screenplays by Crazy Mohan